Pam Shriver was the defending champion but lost in the semifinals to Natasha Zvereva.

Gabriela Sabatini won in the final 6–1, 6–2 against Zvereva.

Seeds
A champion seed is indicated in bold text while text in italics indicates the round in which that seed was eliminated. The top eight seeds received a bye to the second round.

  Martina Navratilova (quarterfinals)
  Chris Evert (semifinals)
  Pam Shriver (semifinals)
  Gabriela Sabatini (champion)
  Helena Suková (quarterfinals)
  Natasha Zvereva (final)
  Lori McNeil (quarterfinals)
 n/a
  Zina Garrison (third round)
  Barbara Potter (third round)
  Sylvia Hanika (third round)
  Larisa Savchenko (second round)
  Helen Kelesi (third round)
  Anne Minter (first round)
 n/a
 n/a

Draw

Finals

Top half

Section 1

Section 2

Bottom half

Section 3

Section 4

References
 1988 Player's Canadian Open Draw

Singles